The 1984 ATP Championship, also known as the Cincinnati Open, was a men's tennis tournament played on outdoor hard courts at the Lindner Family Tennis Center in Mason, Ohio in the United States that was part of the 1984 Volvo Grand Prix. It was the 83rd edition of the tournament and was held from August 20 through August 26, 1984. Third-seeded Mats Wilander won the singles title.

Finals

Singles

 Mats Wilander defeated  Anders Järryd 7–6, 6–3
 It was Wilander's 1st singles title of the year and the 14th of his career.

Doubles

 Francisco González /  Matt Mitchell defeated  Sandy Mayer /  Balázs Taróczy 4–6, 6–3, 7–6

References

External links
 
 ITF tournament edition details
 ATP tournament profile

Cincinnati Open
Cincinnati Masters
1984 in American tennis
Cincin